Knut Fagerbakke (born 4 April 1952) is a Norwegian politician for the Socialist Left Party.

Since 2003 he is the deputy mayor of Trondheim, Norway's third largest city.

Before becoming a full-time politician he worked as a consultant.

References
 Trondheim municipality

1952 births
Living people
Politicians from Trondheim
Socialist Left Party (Norway) politicians
Place of birth missing (living people)
21st-century Norwegian politicians